Matusevich Glacier  is a broad glacier about  long, with a well developed glacier tongue, flowing to the coast of East Antarctica between the Lazarev Mountains and the northwestern extremity of the Wilson Hills.

Geography
The glacier flows toward the coast of East Antarctica, pushing through a channel between the Lazarev Mountains and the north-western tip of the Wilson terrain. Constrained by surrounding rocks, the river of ice holds together. But stresses resulting from the glacier's movement make deep crevasses, or cracks, in the ice.

After passing through the channel, the glacier has room to spread out as it floats on the ocean. The expanded area and the jostling of ocean waves prompts the ice to break apart, which it often does along existing crevasses. Matusevich Glacier does not drain a significant amount of ice off of the Antarctic continent, so the glacier's advances and retreats lack global significance. Like other Antarctic glaciers, however, Matusevich helps glaciologists form a larger picture of Antarctica's glacial health and ice sheet volume.

Discovery and naming
The region was photographed by U.S. Navy Operation Highjump, 1946–47, the Soviet Antarctic Expedition, 1957–58, and the Australian National Antarctic Research Expeditions, 1959 and 1962. It was named by the Soviet expedition after N.N. Matusevich, a Soviet hydrographer and surveyor.

Matusevich Glacier Tongue
The Magga Dan, vessel of the ANARE (Australian National Antarctic Research Expeditions) led by Phillip Law, sailed around the tongue, February 21, 1959, at which time the seaward extremity was determined to be floating in 300 fathoms of ocean.

See also
 Burnside Ridges
 Mount Dalton
 Babushkin Island

References

Glaciers of Oates Land